Robert A. Baines (born 1946) is a former mayor of Manchester, New Hampshire. He served in that office from 2000 to 2006. A Democrat, he was first elected in November 1999, defeating incumbent Republican Raymond Wieczorek. Manchester mayoral elections are held every other year. In Baines' last successful bid for the office, he was elected by over two-thirds of the voters. He was defeated by Republican Alderman Frank Guinta on November 8, 2005.

Biography
Baines grew up in Manchester and earned his bachelor's degree in music education from Keene State College located in Keene, NH in 1968. He earned his master's in school administration in 1976 from Rivier College; he has done additional graduate study at the University of New Hampshire. He married his wife, Maureen, in 1974.

From 1968 to 1977 he was first a music teacher in a Hudson, New Hampshire high school before becoming assistant principal in the same school. 1980 saw Baines become principal of Manchester High School West, a position he was to hold until 1999, when he became mayor.

Baines is father of three children - Timothy, Christina, and Catherine. He is grandfather of Jacob and Lucas Miller (sons of Christina and Michael Miller) as well as Shea and Beau Gardner (sons of Catherine and Ryan Gardner).

On July 21, 2006, Baines underwent surgery at Elliot Hospital in Manchester to remove a blockage in his colon. It was later revealed to have been a cancerous growth.

He has served on the Board of Directors for the National Association of Secondary School Principals and was an Executive in Residence at Southern New Hampshire University. In June 2007 Baines was named interim president of Chester College of New England, a position he was slated to hold for one year while the college searched for a replacement for former college president William Nevious. He was subsequently named president of the college and held that position until 2012. The Board of Trustees made the decision to close the college because of declining enrollment. The faculty and staff of the college reported a vote of no confidence in Baines prior the closing. He is presently the Director of STEAM Ahead in NH, an educational initiative based in Manchester that focuses on Science, Technology, Engineering, Arts and Math. The project is supported by Dyn and SilverTech and is a collaboration with the Manchester School District, Manchester High School WEST, Manchester Community College and the University System of New Hampshire.

Political career and distinctions
Baines served two terms on the Manchester Board of Schools Committee in the early 1970s. He was a member of the 39th Army Band, New Hampshire National Guard from 1970 to 1976, and was awarded the New Hampshire Principal of the Year in 1990. 1996 saw him receive the Educator of the Year award from the Manchester Chamber of Commerce. In 2004 and 2005, he was named one of New Hampshire's "Ten Most Powerful People" by Business NH Magazine. As noted above, he was elected mayor of the city of Manchester in 1999, and reelected in 2001 and 2003. He was defeated in a dramatic upset in 2005 after being harshly criticized for several years of consecutive property tax increases.

Baines was a trustee for the University System of New Hampshire.

On May 11, 2007, a New Hampshire Union Leader blog reported that Baines said he will not seek elected office again.

The Manchester rock band Moes Haven wrote a song called "Bring Back Bob Baines" in their 2006 album "September: In Manchvegas."

Electoral history

Note: Bob Shaw was a write-in candidate who happened to be affiliated with the Democratic Party.

References

External links
Colon tumor was cancer, Baines' family confirms. New Hampshire Union Leader article. by Riley Yates. July 26, 2006. Accessed Aug. 1, 2006.

1946 births
Living people
Schoolteachers from New Hampshire
Mayors of Manchester, New Hampshire
Keene State College alumni
Rivier University alumni
Southern New Hampshire University staff
New Hampshire Democrats